Luc Daniel Adamo Matéta (born October 1949) is a Congolese politician and the President of the Union for the Reconstruction and Development of the Congo (URDC). He was a Minister-Delegate in the government of Congo-Brazzaville from 1995 to 1997, and he was briefly Minister of the Budget and the Coordination of Financial Administration in 1997. Matéta was a candidate in the 2002 presidential election and has been High Commissioner for Civic Instruction and Moral Education since 2002.

Political career
Born in Kitamba in 1949, Matéta studied in the Soviet Union. He worked at the statistics department of the Ministry of the Economy and Finance, and was an early member of the Congolese Movement for Democracy and Integral Development (MCDDI), led by Bernard Kolélas. In the 1992 parliamentary election, he was elected to the National Assembly as an MCDDI candidate in the Pool Region. After Kolélas reached an agreement with President Pascal Lissouba, Matéta was one of the four members of the opposition who were appointed to the government on 23 January 1995; he was named Minister-Delegate for the Budget and the Coordination of Financial Administration.

In the midst of the 1997 civil war, Kolélas was appointed as Prime Minister in September 1997 and a national unity government was formed; Matéta was retained in that government and promoted to the post of Minister of the Budget and the Coordination of Financial Administration.  The Kolélas government survived for only one month, however; rebels loyal to Denis Sassou Nguesso captured Brazzaville in mid-October 1997. Matéta fled into exile.

After the 1997 civil war, as fighting continued between the government of President Sassou Nguesso and "Ninja" rebels, Matéta returned to Congo-Brazzaville in 1998 and renounced armed struggle in 1999. Also in 1999, he became a member of the bureau of the Coordination Committee for the Monitoring of the Cease-Fire Agreement and was assigned responsibility for finances. Later, Matéta was appointed as the Commissioner for Project Implementation at the High Commission for the Reintegration of Former Combatants in August 2001.

Matéta left the MCDDI and created a new political party, the URDC; it was founded on 25 January 2002, and Matéta led the party as its president. He stood in the 10 March 2002 presidential election as the candidate of the Convention for Democracy and the Republic, receiving 1.59% of the vote and placing fifth. Following the election, he visited President Sassou Nguesso on 18 March and congratulated Sassou Nguesso on his victory.

Matéta stood as a URDC candidate in Mfilou, the seventh arrondissement of Brazzaville, in the May–June 2002 parliamentary election, but failed to win a seat. He was then appointed as High Commissioner for Civic Instruction and Moral Education on 11 October 2002.

In December 2006, a book written by Matéta, Reflections for a New Africa (Réflexions pour une Afrique nouvelle), was published.

Together with the General Movement for the Reconstruction of Congo, led by Jean-Michel Bokamba-Yangouma, Matéta's URDC formed the Coalition of Center Parties (CPC) in April 2008. Initially, Bokamba-Yangouma was President of the CPC and Matéta was its vice-president; later, Matéta and Bokamba-Yangouma served as co-presidents of the CPC. As a centrist party, the URDC is not part of the opposition but is also not part of the Presidential Majority, despite Matéta's official post. It likens its views to Christian democracy.

As High Commissioner for Civic Instruction and Moral Education, Matéta gave a talk on citizenship in the context of elections on 9 June 2009, shortly before the July 2009 presidential election. He noted the importance of exercising one's right to vote, behaving peacefully and responsibly while voting, and waiting for the announcement of results in a disciplined manner. While some opposition groups planned to boycott the election, Matéta stressed that participating in the election was a crucial civic responsibility: "abstention is an act of insubordination to the laws of the Republic, that is to say insubordination to democracy and the sovereignty of the people. Such behavior is antisocial: it denies the foundations of society and leads to chaos."

Matéta presented the second edition of the Congolese Citizen's Guide, a book intended as a guide for the different aspects of citizenship and civic life, to the press on 21 May 2010. He said that the guide was his office's contribution to the 50th anniversary of Congolese independence.

References

External links
"Luc Adamo Mateta : « Il nous faut repartir dans le terroir pour exhumer ce qui était pour nous des repères, des valeurs positives… »" (interview), Les Dépêches de Brazzaville, 15 June 2004 .

Members of the National Assembly (Republic of the Congo)
1949 births
Living people
Finance ministers of the Republic of the Congo
Government ministers of the Republic of the Congo
Congolese Movement for Democracy and Integral Development politicians